Rahul Jandial, M.D., Ph.D. is an American, dual-trained brain surgeon and neuroscientist. He is also a Sunday Times bestselling author with his books translated to over 10 languages.

Academic 
Jandial's published research has appeared in journals such as Neurosurgery, Nature Medicine and Proceeding from the National Academy of Sciences. He has authored 10 academic books on topics ranging from neurosurgery to cancer biology and neuroscience. 

As a professor he received the “distinguished professor award” from UCSD and has been invited as distinguished professor at Oxford and Harvard. 

The Jandial laboratory at City of Hope Cancer Center in Los Angeles is funded by the US Department of Defense.

Jandial earned his B.A from University of California, Berkeley — his M.D. from the University of Southern California (USC), Los Angeles — and his Ph.D. from the University of California at San Diego (UCSD).

Author 
In 2019 Penguin/Random House published Dr. Jandial’s first book Life Lessons from a Brain Surgeon: The new stories and science of the mind, a Sunday Times bestseller translated into 10 languages.

In 2021 his memoir Life on a Knife’s Edge: A Brain Surgeon's Reflections on Life, Loss and Survival is an international bestseller with translation to 8 languages.

He has been featured in The Times of London, the Telegraph, Cosmopolitan, Mr. Porter  and GQ, and is an expert for Guardian Masterclasses.

International Service 
He is the founder and co-director of International Neurosurgical Children's Association, where he leads teams to teach and perform pediatric brain surgery in charity hospitals throughout Central and South America, and Eastern Europe. The efforts were featured on ABC Nightline.

Television 

Jandial is a long-term contributor at KTLA-TV  in Los Angeles. Recently, he is also a regular contributor to the TODAY Show in Australia.  He hosted Brain Surgery Live on Nat Geo with Bryant Gumbell for international broadcast and was on FOX’s primetime non-scripted Superhuman as a panelist. Brian Lowry, chief TV critic for Variety, called him the "world's most dashing neurosurgeon" in a highly positive review.

ABC news has called him the "real Dr. McDreamy" and VICE has featured and refers to him as the 100 percent emoji-human version.

He is represented by the talent agency - WME.

Books 
 Life on a Knife’s Edge: A Brain Surgeon’s Reflections on Life, Loss and Survival, by Rahul Jandial, 2021
 Life Lessons from a Brain Surgeon: The New Science and Stories of the Brain, by Rahul Jandial, 2019
 Core Techniques in Operative Neurosurgery, by Rahul Jandial, Paul McCormick, Peter M. Black, 2011, 
 Frontiers in Brain Repair, edited by Rahul Jandial, 2012  
 Code Blue: Bedside Procedures and Critical Information, by Rahul Jandial and Danielle Jandial, 2014 
 Metastatic Cancer: Clinical and Biological Perspectives, edited by Rahul Jandial, 2013  
 Regenerative Biology of the Spine and Spinal Cord, edited by Rahul Jandial and Mike Y. Chen, 2012,  
 100 Questions and Answers About Spine Disorders by Rahul Jandial, Henry E. Aryan, 2008, 
 100 Questions and Answers About Head and Brain Injuries, by Rahul Jandial, Samuel A. Hughes, Charles B. Newman, 2008, 
 Neurosurgical Essentials, by Rahul Jandial, Henry E. Aryan, Peter Nakaji, 2004,

Awards 
 The Sunday Times Bestselling Author 2019
 Department of Defense Breast Cancer Research Program Breakthrough Award 2015 and 2019
 Distinguished Teaching Award UC San Diego 2008
 Penfield Research Award from the Congress of Neurosurgeons 2007
 Cancer Research Award: STOPCancer Foundation: 2009
 Public Service Award, American Association of Neurological Surgeons, 2004

References

University of California, Berkeley alumni
People from Los Angeles
American neurosurgeons
1972 births
Keck School of Medicine of USC alumni
University of California, San Diego alumni
Living people
American physicians of Indian descent